Salahuddin Ahmad is a Bangladeshi jurist, the Attorney General of Bangladesh from 13 July 2008 to 12 January 2009, and a prominent practicing lawyer of the Supreme Court of Bangladesh. Ahmad was appointed after Fida M. Kamal, the then attorney general, resigned from his office in the wake of a series of disagreements with the government over a number of issues.

Career
After the Grand Alliance led by Awami League leader Sheikh Hasina formed a new government on January 6, 2009, Salahuddin Ahmad submitted his "resignation to the law minister in line with the tradition that the attorney general resigns after a new government takes over". Ahmad has been replaced by Mahbub-e Alam.

He completed his BSc in economics from London School of Economics in 1969; MA from University of London in 1970 and LL.M from Columbia Law School in 1984.

Ahmad taught economics at University of Dhaka in the 1970s and has been associated with Dr. Kamal Hossain & Associates.

He was appointed as the director of the School of Law at the University of Asia Pacific for two years in the year 2018. He taught several modules in both the Bachelor of Laws and Master of Laws level.

References

Living people
Alumni of the London School of Economics
Columbia Law School alumni
Academic staff of the University of Dhaka
Year of birth missing (living people)
20th-century Bangladeshi lawyers
Attorneys General of Bangladesh